Scirus or Skiros was a town of ancient Arcadia, and later of Laconia in the region of Sciritis, near Mount Maenalus and Parrhasia. Its location is unknown.

References

Populated places in ancient Arcadia
Populated places in ancient Laconia
Former populated places in Greece
Lost ancient cities and towns